Pennsylvania Route 304 (PA 304) is a  state highway located in Union County, Pennsylvania, United States.  The western terminus is at PA 45 in Mifflinburg.  The eastern terminus is at US 15 in Winfield.

Route description

PA 304 begins at an intersection with PA 45 in the borough of Mifflinburg in Union County, heading southeast on two-lane undivided South 4th Street. The road heads through residential areas before crossing into Limestone Township. In this area, the route heads south into open agricultural areas with a few homes, becoming an unnamed road. PA 304 curves southeast and reaches the residential community of Dice, continuing through a mix of farmland and woodland with a few residences. The road turns northeast through more open agricultural lands until it crosses into the borough of New Berlin. At this point, the name of the route becomes and it passes several homes, coming to an intersection with the northern terminus of PA 204. After passing through more of the town, PA 304 heads back into agricultural areas with some residences and becomes County Line Road as it runs to the north of Penns Creek. The route becomes the border between Union Township, Union County to the north and Jackson Township, Snyder County to the south, with the creek turning south away from the road. PA 304 splits from County Line Road and fully enters Union Township as it passes through more rural areas on an unnamed road, running through Dry Valley Cross Roads. The road continues northeast through more farmland with occasional residences before coming to the community of Winfield. Here, PA 304 turns north and passes homes prior to ending at US 15.

Major intersections

PA 304 Truck

Pennsylvania Route 304 Truck (PA 304 Truck) is a  truck route in and around Mifflinburg. Narrow streets within the borough are avoided by this designation, and a complicated intersection with Pennsylvania Route 45, which does not contain turning lanes, is bypassed. The route is concurrent with other highways for its entire length: It is cosigned with PA 104 for the first  of the route, and is designated SR 3004 (Red Ridge Road) for the remainder. It is signed in the eastbound direction only, with the opposite direction signed as PA 45 Truck.

See also

References

External links

Pennsylvania Highways: PA 304

304
Transportation in Union County, Pennsylvania